The Libertines is the second studio album by English indie rock band The Libertines. Released on 30 August 2004, it is particularly biographical of the relationship between frontmen Carl Barât and Pete Doherty. The album debuted at number one on the UK Albums Chart, selling 72,189 copies in its first week of release.

The album is included in the book 1001 Albums You Must Hear Before You Die. In 2006, NME placed the album 47 in a list of the greatest British albums ever. In 2013, NME ranked the album at number 99 in its list of The 500 Greatest Albums of All Time. On the other hand, The Libertines was voted the third-most overrated album ever made in a 2005 BBC public poll.

The Libertines, like its 2002 predecessor, Up the Bracket, was re-released with a bonus DVD on 22 November 2004. The DVD, entitled Boys in the Band, is a collection of live shows, band interviews, and the "Can't Stand Me Now" promotional video.

The song "Arbeit Macht Frei" featured in the 2006 film Children of Men.

Cover art
The album's front cover art features a photograph of Carl Barât and Pete Doherty taken by Roger Sargent during the emotional "Freedom Gig" at the Tap 'n' Tin club in Chatham, Kent, on 8 October 2003, when Doherty reunited with the Libertines for a gig just hours after being released from jail, where he was sentenced for breaking into Barât's flat and stealing various items, including an old guitar and a laptop computer. Doherty returned to the Tap 'n' Tin club on 20 December 2008 for a one-off gig with Chas & Dave.

Singles
"Can't Stand Me Now" 9 August 2004, (Rough Trade) No. 2
"What Became of the Likely Lads" 25 October 2004 (Rough Trade) No. 9
"What Katie Did" was released as a one-sided, 7-inch flexi disc given away with Amelia's Magazine<ref>{{cite web |url=http://frenchdogwrittles.myfastforum.org/Libertines_et_all_7_records_about39370.html?sid=6931992b3b31ed18b674f08a7a7c0662 |archive-url=https://archive.today/20120718165446/http://frenchdogwrittles.myfastforum.org/Libertines_et_all_7_records_about39370.html?sid=6931992b3b31ed18b674f08a7a7c0662 |url-status=dead |archive-date=2012-07-18 |title=French Dog Writtles • View topic – Libertines et all 7 records |publisher=Frenchdogwrittles.myfastforum.org |accessdate=2012-10-26 }}</ref>

Track listing
 "Can't Stand Me Now" (Peter Doherty, Carl Barât, Mark Hammerton) – 3:23
 "Last Post on the Bugle" (Doherty, Barât, Michael Bower) – 2:32
 "Don't Be Shy" (Doherty, Barât) – 3:03
 "The Man Who Would Be King" (Doherty, Barât) – 3:59
 "Music When the Lights Go Out" (Doherty) – 3:02
 "Narcissist" (Barât) – 2:10
 "The Ha Ha Wall" (Doherty, Barât) – 2:29
 "Arbeit Macht Frei" (Doherty) – 1:13
 "Campaign of Hate" (Doherty) – 2:10
 "What Katie Did" (Doherty) – 3:49
 "Tomblands" (Barât, Doherty) – 2:06
 "The Saga" (Doherty, Paul Roundhill) – 1:53
 "Road to Ruin" (Doherty, Barât) – 4:21
 "What Became of the Likely Lads" (Doherty, Barât) / "France" (Barât) (Hidden track) – 5:54

Japanese bonus tracks
<li>"Don't Look Back into the Sun" (New Version) (Doherty, Barât)
<li>"Cyclops" (Doherty, Peter Wolfe)
<li>"Dilly Boys" (Doherty, Barât)

Australian bonus tracks
<li>"France" (Doherty, Barât)
<li>"Never Never" (Doherty, Barât)
<li>"I Got Sweets" (Doherty, Barât)

Japanese and Mexican bonus DVD
 "What a Waster" (Live at The Factory, Japan)
 "Death on the Stairs" (Live at The Factory, Japan)
 "Up the Bracket" (Live at The Factory, Japan)
 "I Get Along" (Live at The Factory, Japan)
 "The Boy Looked at Johnny" (Live at The Factory, Japan)
 "The Boy Looked at Johnny" (Live at Moby Dick, Spain)
 Busking for Beer + Assorted Covers and Song Segments (Live at Filthy McNasty's Pub, London)
 "Can't Stand Me Now" (Video)
 Photo Gallery
 Extras (Footage of Band, Interviews and NME award footage)

As well as the songs listed above, there is a hidden track, titled "France", composed by Barat, which starts at 3:28 of "What Became of the Likely Lads". A re-recording of an old Libertines song which originally appeared on one of their first demos, recorded at Odessa Studios, "France" was written and performed by Carl Barât. The final listed track is a nod to the British sitcom Whatever Happened to the Likely Lads?''.

Charts

Weekly charts

Year-end charts

References

The Libertines albums
2004 albums
Rough Trade Records albums